Pachythelia villosella is a moth of the Psychidae family. It is found in Europe.

The wingspan is 13–15 mm for males. Head, thorax,
and abdomen pale brownish-ochreous. Forewings and hindwings thinly
haired, dark brown or grey brown; veins and base of cilia darker. Females are wingless and have a rounded frontal prominence. Adults are on wing in June and July.

The larvae feed on Calluna and Sarothamnus species from within a case.

References

Psychidae
Moths of Europe
Moths described in 1810
Taxa named by Ferdinand Ochsenheimer